The reptiles and amphibians of the Eastern Highlands of Zimbabwe and Mozambique mark a biodiversity hotspot for herpetofauna. Diverse reptile and amphibian communities include endemic species.

Geography and climate
The Eastern Highlands extend 300 kilometres (190 mi) along Zimbabwe's eastern border with Mozambique. There are two broadly defined high-altitude ecological habitats in the Eastern Zimbabwe montane forest-grassland mosaic; a wet lowland forest ecology predominates the eastern side of the mountain ranges, while a more arid ecology dominates the western side. The Highlands have a more equable climate than Zimbabwe's central plateau, with higher rainfall, low cloud and heavy mists and dew as moisture moves inland from the Indian Ocean. Many streams and rivers originate in these mountains, which form the watershed between the Zambezi and Save river systems.

Species lists

Tortoises 

 Leopard tortoise, Geochelone pardalis babcocki: Very large specimens of this species live in the Nyanga and Chipinge Downs. Juveniles are preyed on by ground hornbills and secretarybirds.
 Speke's hinge-back tortoise, Kinixys spekii: specialists of kopje areas and live amongst the boulders of granite outcrops.

Lizards and amphisbaenians

Skinks 

 Arnold's skink, Proscelotes arnoldi – endemic

Geckos 

 Bernard's dwarf gecko, Lygodactylus bernardi (Fitzsimmons, 1958) – endemic to the Nyanga Mountains of Zimbabwe and Mozambique
 Cape dwarf gecko, Lygodactylus capensis (A. Smith, 1849)

Chameleons 

 Marshall's pygmy chameleon or Marshall's leaf chameleon, Rhampholeon marshalli – endemic

Amphisbaenians 

 Swynnerton's worm lizard, Chirindia swynnertoni – Mozambique plain and adjacent Zimbabwe
 Ferocious round-headed worm lizard, Zygaspis ferox – endemic to Chirinda Forest and vicinity
 Rhodesian spade-snouted worm lizard, Monopeltis rhodesiana – ranges to Malawi

Snakes

Frogs

Bibliography 
 Branch, B. (2003). Snakes and other Reptiles of Southern Africa. Struik.
 Lambiris, Angelo J. L. (1989). "The Frogs of Zimbabwe". Natural Science Museum of Turin Monographs.

References

Eastern Highlands
Fauna of the Eastern Highlands